Ridley High School serves the Ridley School District. It is located in Folsom, Pennsylvania, United States.  The new high school opened in September 2001. In the 2017–2018 school year, Ridley High School had 1,787 students.

History

The original building, previously known as Ridley Township High School, was completed in 1934 and was built, in part, by funding from the Works Progress Administration. The library, auditorium, and gym additions of the old school, built in the late 1960s still stand and are used as a community center.  In 2001 a new building was constructed. The sports teams use the community center gym for indoor training. The school had added a pond for the students involved with environmental classes and activities. Ridley also has a natatorium.

Extracurriculars
The district offers a variety of clubs, activities and sports.

Athletics 
Ridley sports teams compete in the Central League and include:

Baseball
Basketball
Cheerleading
Cross Country
Football
Field Hockey
Golf
Ice hockey
Lacrosse
Soccer
Softball
Swimming and Diving
Tennis
Track & Field
Indoor Track
Volleyball
Wrestling

Windscript 
Ridley High School's literary-arts magazine serves as an outlet for student creativity. Windscript won the Gold Crown Award from the Columbia Scholastic Press Association of Columbia University in 2006.

Notable alumni

Jim Beard, jazz musician and member of Steely Dan
Matt Blundin (1987), former NFL quarterback, Kansas City Chiefs
Wendell Butler Jr., mayor of Chester, Pennsylvania
Paul Felder (2004) UFC lightweight and former CFFC lightweight champion
Philip S. Johnson (1970), violinist
Carol Kazeem (2010), Pennsylvania State Representative
Bob Kuberski (1989), former NFL defensive lineman, member of Super Bowl XXXI champion Green Bay Packers
Bill McGlone (2002), professional lacrosse player
Michael Philip Mossman, jazz musician and film composer
Brett Moyer (2002), lacrosse player
Bob Rigby, former professional soccer player, former member of United States men's national soccer team
Dave Schulthise, bassist, Dead Milkmen
Joseph Rockwell, Illusionist, NEET master, professional swindler
J. Randy Taraborrelli, New York Times best-selling author
Joe Valerio (1987), former NFL player, Kansas City Chiefs

References

External links 
 
 Ridley Football official website
 Ridley Swimming & Diving official website

Public high schools in Pennsylvania
Educational institutions established in 1925
Works Progress Administration in Pennsylvania
Schools in Delaware County, Pennsylvania
1925 establishments in Pennsylvania
School buildings completed in 2001